Amtel, Inc. is a telecommunications management company based in Santa Clara, California, providing cloud based mobile device security and expense management solutions. The company primarily focuses on providing integrated enterprise mobility management, telecom expense management (TEM), and secure messaging software as a service for enterprises. Amtel’s SaaS solution for managing smart mobile devices allows organizations to manage mobile device security, mobile apps, and fixed telecom services from a single Web based console.

History
Amtel was founded in 2004. The company developed and marketed an integrated software-as-a-service (SaaS) solution for telecom and mobile life cycle management.
  
The company’s Mobile Device Management (MDM) solution for iOS (iPhone, iPad), Android (Smartphones, Tablets), Blackberry and Windows devices was launched in 2010. With this program, Amtel combined mobile device security management with mobile apps management into a telecom information management system (TIMS) platform.

The components of the system - [mobile device management], mobile expense management, and telecom expense management - could be set up separately or managed together from a single Web based console.

On 16th April 2016, the business was acquired by Netplus, before being acquired further by StoneCalibre.

References 

Mobile device management
Telecommunications companies of the United States
Companies based in Santa Clara, California